The Ministry of Justice; abbreviated as MoJ) is a cabinet-level ministry of Pakistan, responsible and for the enforcement of law and administration of justice.

The ministry's political executive figure is known as the Minister for Law, Justice and Human Rights, who must be an elected legislator and Parliamentarian. The Minister for Justice is associated with enforcing laws and administration of government judicial departments, and is a public face of the government in legal services required by the state. The ministry's administration is headed by the Law Secretary of Pakistan. The ministry is also represented by the Attorney General as the chief law enforcement officer of the federal government, representing it in civilian Supreme Court cases, and assisting the Minister for Justice and the government in legal cases. Both the Minister for Justice and Attorney General are nominated by the Prime Minister of Pakistan, and are members of the Cabinet. It is currently headed by Ayaz Sadiq as of 31 October 2022.

Departments

Competition Appellate Tribunal 
Appellate Tribunal established in 2010 to hear appeals decision by Competition Commission of Pakistan

Anti Dumping Appellate Tribunal 
Appellate Tribunal established in 2000 to redress the issues relating to imposition of anti-dumping duties by National Tariff Commission, to offset injurious dumping in the public interest.

Accountability Courts 

Courts established to hear cases of National Accountability Bureau.

References

External links 
 Law and Justice Commission of Pakistan
 Pakistan Ministry of Law, Justice & Human Rights

 

Pakistan
Pakistan